Markowice may refer to:
Markowice, Greater Poland Voivodeship (west-central Poland)
Markowice, Kuyavian-Pomeranian Voivodeship (north-central Poland)
Markowice, Silesian Voivodeship (south Poland)
Markowice, Opole Voivodeship (south-west Poland)

See also 
Marko (disambiguation)